Noppawan Lertcheewakarn and Lu Jiajing were the defending champions, but both players chose not to participate.

Shuko Aoyama and Makoto Ninomiya won the title, defeating Liang Chen and Wang Yafan in the final, 7–6(7–5), 6–4.

Seeds

Draw

References 
 Draw

Shenzhen - Doubles
Pingshan Open